Stefano Olivato is an Italian bass and chromatic harmonica player. He was born in Venice in 1962. He started playing guitar and around 16 years old he switched to the bass guitar.

In 1991 he participated in the 2nd edition of the Festival di Sanscemo with the song Nobili.

Today he is well known for playing with many important artists as Angelo Branduardi, Dizzy Gillespie, Joe Diorio, Adam Holzman, Airto Moreira, Amii Stewart, Enzo Jannacci, Patty Pravo, Ornella Vanoni, Claudio Lolli, Alessandro Safina, and many others.

In 2010 he won the first "Città di Mestre" contest as Artist of the Year for his artistic and musical activity. He is the first Italian musician to play chromatic harmonica with both pop artist, jazz and classical theatres.

Since 2005 he has been in tour in Italy and in Europe with Angelo Branduardi.

Stefano Olivato is the conductor of the Orchestra popolare di Venezia, which plays venetian popular music; in October 2001 they played at Carnegie Hall in New York City.

In July 2012 Lineeditions presented "Vivaldi and Marcello Concerts for Harmonica and Bass Guitar" , played by Stefano Olivato on harmonica and bass guitar. The CD is a tribute to the great Baroque music from Venice.

Starting by 2014 he teaches in many Italian Conservatories: "Musica d'insieme pop/rock", Tecniche compositive pop/rock" and "Storia della musica pop/rock".

He wrote together with Leonardo Pieri "L'arrangiatore pop/rock" Venezia,2014, Lineeditions.

References 
 https://web.archive.org/web/20120321204513/http://www.semicromaservizi.com/SEMICROMA_SERVIZI/BASSOLO.html
 http://www.branduardi.org/Morimondoconcertoinabbazia/davideragazzoniestefanoolivato.html
http://www.europamici.com/Tour.html
https://www.conservatorio.pr.it/docenti/stefano-olivato/
http://www.constp.it/olivato-stefano

External links
 https://web.archive.org/web/20120321204513/http://www.semicromaservizi.com/SEMICROMA_SERVIZI/BASSOLO.html
 http://www.branduardi.org/Morimondoconcertoinabbazia/davideragazzoniestefanoolivato.html
 http://www.europamici.com/Tour.html
 http://triestelovesjazz.com/2011/?tag=adam-holzman-trio
 http://www.constp.it/olivato-stefano
 https://www.conservatorio.pr.it/docenti/stefano-olivato/

Musicians from Venice
Living people
1962 births
Harmonica players